Marcel Ruijters (born 1966) is a Dutch cartoonist. He is the winner of the 2015 Stripschapprijs.

References

Dutch cartoonists
Winners of the Stripschapsprijs
Living people
1966 births
Place of birth missing (living people)
Date of birth missing (living people)
21st-century Dutch male artists